The New York State Housing Finance Agency (HFA) is a New York State public-benefit corporation created in 1960 to build and preserve affordable multifamily rental housing throughout New York State. HFA sells bonds and uses the proceeds to make mortgages to affordable housing developers. It and its subsidiaries are now administered by New York State Homes and Community Renewal.

Developers can take advantage of several financing resources when they obtain HFA financing. These include the All Affordable Housing Program for developments in which 100% of the units are affordable; the Mitchell Lama Rehabilitation and Preservation (RAP) program, which helps renovate state-financed Mitchell Lama projects; and the 80/20 New Construction Housing Program, which provides financing for rental projects where at least 20% of the units are set aside for low-income tenants.

Organization
In 2017, the HFA had operating expenses of $368.76 million, an outstanding debt of $16.780 billion, and a staffing level of 263 people.

The Agency also acts as the administrative arm of the Project Finance Agency, the Affordable Housing Corporation and the Municipal Bond Bank Agency.

Homeless Housing and Assistance Corporation
The Homeless Housing and Assistance Corporation is a subsidiary of the HFA that administers the Homeless Housing Assistance
Program that was formerly administered by the New York State Department of Social Services. Funding received by the Corporation is used for the purpose of expanding the availability of housing for homeless persons by preserving and creating affordable housing. The monies may be used to construct new properties, rehabilitate under utilized property, or convert vacant nonresidential property to residential use for occupancy by persons of low income who are homeless. In 2017, the Homeless Housing and Assistance Corporation had operating expenses of $69.27 million.

New York State Housing Trust Fund Corporation
The New York State Housing Trust Fund Corporation is a subsidiary of the HFA that administers the Low Income Housing Trust Fund Program; the purpose of which is to grant or loan up to $40,000 per housing unit. The advance may be used to rehabilitate vacant or under-utilized residential  property, or convert vacant non-residential property to  residential use for occupancy by low income homesteaders, tenants, tenant-cooperators or condominium owners. In 2017, the Housing Trust Fund Corporation had operating expenses of $2.835 billion and a staffing level of 219 people.

New York State Affordable Housing Corporation
HFA’s subsidiary, the New York State Affordable Housing Corporation (AHC), was established in 1985 to promote homeownership by low- and moderate-income households. Using resources appropriated by the State Legislature, AHC awards grants to local governments, nonprofits and charitable organizations to subsidize the cost of newly constructed homes and the cost of renovating existing housing. In 2017, the AHC had operating expenses of $2.65 million and a staff level of 199 people. The compensation for its staff exceeds its listed operating expenses by just under $4 million in the 2018 New York State Authorities Budget Office report.

See also
 Empire State Development Corporation
 Nyhomes
 State of New York Mortgage Agency
 State of New York Municipal Bond Bank Agency

References

External links
 nyhomes.org
 New York State Housing Finance Agency in the New York Codes, Rules and Regulations
 NYSHCR website

Public benefit corporations in New York (state)
Housing finance agencies of the United States
1960 establishments in New York (state)